Babylon (Music from the Motion Picture) is the score album to the 2022 film of the same name directed by Damien Chazelle. The original music composed by Justin Hurwitz, Chazelle's frequent collaborator, which is set for release on December 9, 2022 by Interscope Records, two weeks ahead of the film's release on December 23, features 48 tracks running over an hour. Two of the tracks "Call Me Manny" and "Voodoo Mama" were released on November 11.

Background 
The film marked the fifth project in the collaboration of Chazelle and Hurwitz together, after Guy and Madeline on a Park Bench (2009), Whiplash (2014), La La Land (2016) and First Man (2018). Hurwitz nearly worked on Babylon for three years to create a "unique musical universe" that is believable enough for the 1920s, but also "a far cry from the quaint jazz of the period", which was a "challenge" for the composer. He created a "fresh concoction that matched the wild, hedonistic world of the film", by using jazz band instruments in more contemporary ways, drawing inspiration from rock and roll, and modern dance music. The soundtrack also includes pieces scored for a "manic" 100-piece orchestra recorded in Los Angeles, as well as other cues scores with circus sounds. Hurwitz said that "a huge part of scoring process was to find unique musicians to bring it to life" and credited musicians Sean Jones, Dontae Winslow, Ludovic Louis, Jacob Scesney,  and Leo Pellegrino for their contribution to the score.

The score will be published by Interscope Records which released Hurwitz's Academy Award-winning soundtrack for La La Land. Interscope officially announced the album on November 10, 2022 and its pre-orders of the soundtrack, set for December 9 release. The following day, two songs—"Call Me Manny" and "Voodoo Mama" were released for preview. "Call Me Manny" plays during the furor over Manny's (Diego Calva) latest gig, while "Voodoo Mama" is played at Nellie LaRoy (Margot Robbie) "takes over the dance floor at the party" when the film starts. The track underscored the film's trailer that released on September.

Promotion 
Babylon Jazz Night at Delilah event will be held at Delilah in West Hollywood, California on December 11, 2022, hosted by Paramount Pictures, Interscope and Los Angeles-based The h.wood Group, to promote the film. The event featured an orchestra band led by Hurwitz, the cast members, along with a dance party with the guests. H.wood also provides on-theme décor and atmosphere to "reflect the backdrop reflective of the vibes and aesthetic of the roaring 20s and old Hollywood through a modern lens".

Track listing

Reception

Critical response 
The first two preview tracks, "Call Me Manny" and "Voodoo Mama" were reviewed by Rolling Stone's Jon Blistein who mentioned it as "pulsating blasts of hot jazz stuffed with thundering drums and boozy horns". At the special screening of the film, press critics praised Hurwitz's score, with Jeff Nelson calling it as "one hell of a wall of sound".

Music critic Jonathan Broxton wrote "while Justin Hurwitz’s music enhances the magnificent extravagance of that life and that time, it makes sure it doesn’t overlook the pain and the pathos either." Filmtracks.com reviewed "the soundtrack for Babylon is smart dysfunction by design, Hurwitz opting for insanity as a method of enhancing the overstimulating nature of the movie. The 97-minute album is an amusing but ultimately exhausting and defeating experience. It's the kind of work that makes you laugh and shake your head while vowing never to revisit it again."

Industry reactions 
The film received attention from industry members in the 2023 award season, highlighting the possiblities of award nominations at major ceremonies. Hurwitz's score has been highlighted by critics from various publications, as the possible contender for the Academy Award for Best Original Score at the 95th Academy Awards, with Paul Sheehan of GoldDerby analysing that the score has been the leading contenders for that category. Aside Academy Awards, the score will also be a major contender for the 80th Golden Globe Awards, highlighted by Variety's Clayton Davis. It would later win the Best Original Score category.

Awards and nominations

References 

2022 soundtrack albums
Interscope Records soundtracks
Jazz soundtracks
Contemporary classical music soundtracks